Jorge Vilda Rodríguez (born 7 July 1981) is a Spanish football coach and UEFA Pro Licence holder, who is the current head coach of the Spain women's national football team - a position he has held since 2015. Vilda is also sporting director of the Spanish FA's (RFEF) women's national-team system and tactical instructor at their National Coaching School.

A former youth player at Real Madrid, Rayo Vallecano and FC Barcelona, Vilda began as an assistant coach at WU17 and WU19 level, before taking the head coach's position with Spain's WU17s in 2009. During five years at that level, Spain won gold (2010 & 2011), silver (2014) and bronze (2013) at UEFA Women's U-17 EUROs, in addition to silver (2014) and bronze (2010) at the FIFA U-17 Women's World Cup.

In 2014 he was among the ten nominees for that year's FIFA Coach of the Year for Women's Football and was appointed to the head coach's role with Spain's WU19s, who collected silver medals at the UEFA Women's U-19 EURO in 2014 and 2015 before being appointed as head coach to the senior side since then.

Spain women's national football team 

Appointed Spain's senior head coach in 2015, succeeding Ignacio Quereda, Vilda oversaw a successful qualifying campaign for the UEFA Women's EURO 2017. At the competition in the Netherlands they reached the quarter-finals, where they lost on penalties to Austria  after a 0–0 draw.

In 2018 Spain won the Cyprus Cup and also secured their place at the 2019 FIFA Women's World Cup - only their second appearance at the global event. Additionally, Vilda oversaw Spain's victory at the UEFA WU19 EURO, which contributed to being shortlisted for the award of The Best FIFA Woman's Coach 2018.

By 2019, many of the players that Vilda had worked with at youth level, including Alexia Putellas, Amanda Sampedro, Virginia Torrecilla, Lola Gallardo, Nahikari García, Patri Guijarro, Mariona Caldentey and Ivana Andrés, had all established themselves as regular senior-squad members. At France 2019, Spain qualified from Group B in second place (behind Germany and ahead of China PR and South Africa), the first time Spain had reached the knockout stages of the FIFA WWC.

Drawn against 2015 champions USA in the Round of 16, two penalties from Megan Rapinoe ended Spain's chances of reaching the last eight. Vilda and Spain's momentum has continued into 2020, with La Roja finishing second in the She Believes Cup - beating England and Japan and losing to hosts United States.

In 2023, a rift between Vilda and the players has emerged with 15 of Spain's top female players making themselves unavailable for the 2023 Cup of Nations tournament in Australia in the lead up to the 2023 FIFA Women's World Cup.

Managerial honours
Spain Women
 Algarve Cup: 2017
 Cyprus Cup: 2018
Spain U19 women 
 UEFA Women's Under-19 Championship runner-up: 2014, 2015
Spain U17 women
 UEFA Women's Under-17 Championship: 2010, 2011; runners-up: 2014; third place: 2013
 FIFA U-17 Women's World Cup runners-up: 2014; third place: 2010
Individual
 FIFA World Coach of the Year for Women's Football; Nominated: 2011, 2014; Shortlisted in 2018

References

External links
 
 https://www.womenssoccerunited.com/jorge-vilda-interview/
 https://www.uefa.com/teamsandplayers/coaches/coach=250014446/profile/index.html
 FIFA.com
 FIFA.com

Living people
Spanish football managers
Spain women's national football team managers
1981 births
Footballers from Madrid
2019 FIFA Women's World Cup managers
Association footballers not categorized by position
Association football players not categorized by nationality
UEFA Women's Euro 2022 managers